The Escape to Plastic Beach Tour was a concert tour by the British alternative rock virtual band Gorillaz in support of their third studio album Plastic Beach. During the tour, Damon Albarn recorded The Fall, described by Albarn as a "diary of [his] experience" throughout its American leg. The album was released in late December 2010 to fan club members, and physically in April 2011.

Live band
Damon Albarn – lead vocals, keyboards, piano, acoustic guitar, melodica
Paul Simonon – bass guitar, background vocals
Mick Jones – rhythm guitar, background vocals
Jeff Wootton – lead guitar (Certain dates)
Simon Tong – lead guitar (replaced Jeff Wootton on certain dates)
Cass Browne – drums, drum machine
Mike Smith – keyboards
Gabriel "Manuals" Wallace – drums, percussion
Jesse Hackett – keyboards

Guest collaborators and additional musicians
Bashy – rap on "Clint Eastwood" and "White Flag"
Kano – rap on "Clint Eastwood" and "White Flag"
Mos Def – rap on "Stylo" and "Sweepstakes" (select dates only)
Lou Reed – guitar and vocals on "Some Kind of Nature" (New York City and Los Angeles only)
Bobby Womack – vocals on "Stylo", "Cloud of Unknowing" and "Demon Days"
Neneh Cherry – vocals on "Kids with Guns" (select dates only)
Bootie Brown – rap on "Dirty Harry" and "Stylo" 
MF Doom – rap on "Clint Eastwood" and "November Has Come" (select dates only)
Miho Hatori – vocals on "19-2000" (select dates only)
Yukimi Nagano – vocals on "Empire Ants" and "To Binge" (select dates only)
De La Soul – rap on "Feel Good Inc." and "Superfast Jellyfish"
Daley – vocals on "Doncamatic" (select dates only)
Mark E. Smith – vocals on "Glitter Freeze" (select dates only)
Roses Gabor – vocals on "19-2000" and "Dare"
Members of Syrian National Orchestra for Arabic Music – orchestration on "White Flag"
The Hypnotic Brass Ensemble – brass on "Welcome to the World of the Plastic Beach", "Broken", "Sweepstakes" and "Plastic Beach"
Demon Strings – strings

Opening acts
We Are Wolves (Montreal)
N.E.R.D. (North America)
Little Dragon, De La Soul (Europe, Asia & Oceania)

Production
The Escape to Plastic Beach Tour also featured new music videos and visuals on the big screen in the background while band members played up front. Visuals accompanied such songs as "Broken", "Welcome to the World of the Plastic Beach", "Dirty Harry", "Empire Ants", "Last Living Souls", "White Flag" and many others alongside the original music videos for the group's previous songs.

The poster used to promote the tour was highly influenced by the theatrical poster for the 1969 Sam Peckinpah western, The Wild Bunch.

The tour was later noted by Albarn to be an extremely costly endeavor; in a 2013 interview with Rolling Stone, Albarn explained: "I made about 20 pounds by the end of it, so I won't be going on another of those. It was incredible fun, I loved doing it, but economically it was an absolute fucking disaster."

Setlist
The following setlist is obtained from the concert held at the Bell Centre in Montreal, on 3 October 2010. It is not a representation of all shows on the tour.

Songs performed

Tour dates

Cancelled shows

Box office score data

References

Gorillaz concert tours
2010 concert tours